Giou-de-Mamou is a commune in the Cantal department in south-central France.

Geography 
Giou-de-Mamou is 564 km away from  Paris and 6 km away from Aurillac.

The village lies at an altitude of 740 metres and is only 20 km away from the Heart of the Auvergne Volcano Park.

Language
The Occitan language was historically dominant in Cantal.

Climate
Giou de Mamou's climate is quite cold in winter (it snows almost every year), but it can be very hot during the summer times.

History
Giou-de-Mamou's rock has probably been inhabited since the Celtic period (megalithic remains have been found in the village).

The name Giou-de-Mamou is of ancient origins and would indicate that Jupiter (Jovis) was worshiped there.

Prior to the French Revolution Giou de Mamou was part of a former province of Auvergne called Haute-Auvergne.
Giou de Mamou joined the Aurillac district in 1990.

Population

Sights
 St-Bonnet Church (Fifteenth Century)
 Megalithic remains, esp. in L'Hôpital (3 km from the centre of the village)
 Beliashe Theatre: Production and distribution of shows

See also
Communes of the Cantal department

References

Communes of Cantal